Maurice Le Sage d'Hauteroche d'Hulst (born at Paris, 10 October 1841; died there, 6 November 1896) was a French Roman Catholic priest, writer, and orator. He was the founder of the Institut Catholique de Paris.

Life 
After a course in the Collège Stanislas, he entered the seminary of Saint-Sulpice and later proceeded to Rome to finish his ecclesiastical studies. There he obtained the doctorate in divinity. 

On his return he was for some time employed on the mission as curate in the populous parish of St. Ambrose. During the war of 1870 he became a volunteer chaplain in the army. In 1873 Cardinal Guibert called him to take part in the administration of the diocese, but he was engaged principally in founding and organizing the free Catholic University (then the Université Catholique de Paris), which the bishops opened at Paris after the passage of the law of 12 July 1875, allowing liberty of higher education. He became its rector in 1880 and for fifteen years devoted himself to developing it in every branch of learning. 

In 1891 he succeeded Père Monsabré in the pulpit of Notre-Dame de Paris and preached the Lenten conferences there for six successive years, on the bases of Christian morality and the Decalogue. In 1892 he was elected deputy for Finistère on the death of Mgr Freppel. 

He died while still active, after a short illness.

Works
Besides two biographies, the "Vie de la Mère Marie-Thérèse" (Paris, 1872) and the "Vie de Just de Bretenières" (Paris, 1892), he wrote "L'éducation supérieure" (Paris, 1886); "Le Droit chrétien et le Droit moderne", a commentary on the Encyclical "Immortale" of Leo XIII (Paris, 1886), a volume of "Mélanges philosophiques" (2nd ed., 1903); and also published two volumes "Mélanges oratoires" (Paris, 1891 and 1892) and the six volumes of his "Conférenees de Notre-Dame", with notes and appendixes (Paris, 1891–96). 

Among the many articles he contributed to the current reviews were the "Examen de conscience de Renan"; "Une Ame royale et chrétienne" (a necrology of the Comte de Paris), and "La Question biblique". Most of his occasional discourses were collected and published by the Abbé Odelin in the four volumes entitled "Nouveaux Mélanges oratoires" (Paris, 1900–07). Mgr Baudrillart, his successor at the head of the Catholic University, after the rectorship of Mgr Péchenard, published a collection of "Lettres de Direction" of Mgr d'Hulst.

See also

References

Attribution
 Under the title Recueil de souvenirs à la mémoire de Mgr Le Sage d'Hauteroche d'Hulst the principal discourses and articles on Mgr d'Hulst after his death have been issued in one volume (Paris, 1898).

1841 births
1896 deaths
19th-century French Roman Catholic priests
Collège Stanislas de Paris alumni
Modernism in the Catholic Church